William Allison House may refer to:

William Allison House (Spring Mills, Pennsylvania), listed on the National Register of Historic Places in Centre County, Pennsylvania
William Allison House (College Grove, Tennessee), listed on the National Register of Historic Places in Williamson County, Tennessee

See also
Allison House (disambiguation)